Volpin, sometimes also transliterated Wolpin, is a Russian surname.

Notable people with this surname include:

Volpin
 Alexander Esenin-Volpin (1924-2016), Russian-American poet and mathematician
 Mikhail Volpin (1902-1988), Soviet screenwriter

Wolpin
 Kenneth Wolpin, American economist

See also
 Volpini
 Volpino

Russian-language surnames